Leo Wilhelm "Willie" Wilkens (25 November 1893 – 4 January 1967) was a Swedish rowing coxswain who competed in the 1912 Summer Olympics. He won a silver medal in the coxed four, inriggers, and failed to reach the finals of the eight tournament.

References

1893 births
1967 deaths
Olympic rowers of Sweden
Olympic silver medalists for Sweden
Rowers at the 1912 Summer Olympics
Swedish male rowers
Olympic medalists in rowing
Medalists at the 1912 Summer Olympics
Coxswains (rowing)
Sportspeople from Malmö
20th-century Swedish people